The following is a list of people executed by the U.S. state of West Virginia from 1861 to 1959.

Capital punishment was abolished in West Virginia in 1965. From 1861 to 1959, 112 people have been executed in West Virginia, 102 by hanging, 9 by electrocution and 1 by hanging in chains.

Executions 1861-1959

See also
 Capital punishment in West Virginia
 Capital punishment in the United States

References

People executed by West Virginia
People executed
West Virginia